Zhirnovsk is a town and the administrative center of Zhirnovsky District in Volgograd Oblast, Russia, located on the left bank of the Medveditsa River, which itself flows into the Don. Population:

History

It was founded in 1958 by merging the villages of Zhirnoye Selo and Kurakino Selo, each of which had been founded in their own right in the 17th and 18th centuries. The merger was prompted by the discovery of significant oil deposits near these villages in the 1940s and the consequent establishment of a worker's housing estate in 1954.

Administrative and municipal status
Within the framework of administrative divisions, Zhirnovsk serves as the administrative center of Zhirnovsky District. As an administrative division, it is incorporated within Zhirnovsky District as the town of district significance of Zhirnovsk. As a municipal division, the town of district significance of Zhirnovsk is incorporated within Zhirnovsky Municipal District as Zhirnovskoye Urban Settlement.

Economy
As of 2010, oil and gas processing remains the towns chief industry.

References

Notes

Sources

External links

Official website of Zhirnovsk 
Zhirnovsk Business Directory 

Cities and towns in Volgograd Oblast